Thorold is a city in Ontario, Canada.

 Thorold may also refer to:
Anthony Wilson Thorold  (1825–1895), Anglican bishop of Rochester, later bishop of Winchester
William Thorold (engineer) (1798–1878), English millwright, architect and civil engineer
Thorold Dickinson (1903-1984), British film director and academic
Thorold baronets, four baronetcies in England and Great Britain
Thorold's deer (''Cervus albirostris)